Eupatorium perfoliatum, known as common boneset or just boneset, is a North American perennial plant in the family Asteraceae. It is a common native to the Eastern United States and Canada, widespread from Nova Scotia to Florida, west as far as Texas, Nebraska, the Dakotas, and Manitoba. It is also called agueweed, feverwort, or sweating-plant. It was introduced to American colonists by natives who used the plant for breaking fevers by means of heavy sweating. It is nearly always found in low, wet areas.

Description

The stem is hairy. The plant produces dense clusters of tiny white flower heads held above the foliage. In Illinois, the plant blooms during late summer and early fall. Its native habitats include damp prairies, bogs, and alluvial woods.

Eupatorium perfoliatum can form hybrids with other species of the genus Eupatorium, for example Eupatorium serotinum.

Phytochemistry and safety
Eupatorium perfoliatum leaves and roots contain mixed phytochemicals, including polysaccharides (containing xylose and glucuronic acid), tannins, volatile oil, sesquiterpene lactones, sterols, triterpenes, alkaloids, and various flavonoids, such as quercetin, kaempferol, and caffeic acid derivatives. E. perfoliatum and several of its related species are listed on the Poisonous Plants Database of the US Food and Drug Administration, with E. perfoliatum described as an "unapproved homeopathic medicine" with unknown safety by the US National Library of Medicine.

Holistic health companies marketing fraudulent supplement products that contained E. perforliatum with claims of benefit against COVID-19 were warned by the US Food and Drug Administration in 2020 about making illegal health claims and scamming consumers from their money.

Traditional medicine
Eupatorium perfoliatum (also called boneset) was used in traditional medicine by Native Americans who applied extracts for fever and common colds. Possible effects of E. perfoliatum for these uses remain undefined by adequate scientific research, and are unconfirmed by high-quality clinical research. If consumed in large amounts, its tea made from leaves may cause diarrhea.

References

External links 

perfoliatum
Plants described in 1753
Taxa named by Carl Linnaeus
Butterfly food plants
Medicinal plants of North America
Flora of North America